"Mad About You" is the debut solo single by American singer Belinda Carlisle. It was written by Paula Jean Brown, James Whelan and Mitchel Young Evans, and produced by Michael Lloyd for Carlisle's debut solo album Belinda. The single was released in 1986 as a CD single (one of the first ever marketed), 7-inch single and a 12-inch single. It was her first hit after leaving the Go-Go's, peaking at number three on the U.S. Billboard Hot 100 (where it was on the chart for 21 weeks) and at number one on the Canadian Singles Chart.

Just over three weeks before the single was released, Carlisle married Morgan Mason, who appears with Belinda in the video for "Mad About You". The guitar solo on the song was performed by Andy Taylor (of Duran Duran), who also appears in the video.

Paula Jean Brown (who joined the Go-Go’s as bass guitarist following Jane Wiedlin’s departure) co-wrote the song with Jim Whelan, and Wiedlin and Charlotte Caffey sang back-up vocals. "Mad About You" was one of a few songs being considered for the fourth (unrecorded) Go-Go's album. The Go-Go's split, and "Mad About You" and two other songs co-written by Paula Jean Brown ended up on Belinda.

The single's B-side, "I Never Wanted a Rich Man", was also featured on Carlisle's first long playing work (it closed Side 1 on the vinyl edition). The extended version of "Mad About You", originally on the A-side of the 12" single, was then included on the album compact disc re-release by Virgin in 2003.

Composition 
The song is written in the key of A major in common time with a tempo of 144 beats per minute.

Music video
The music video  was directed by Leslie Libman, and features Andy Taylor of Duran Duran, and Carlisle's husband Morgan Mason. During one scene she dances to a vinyl LP of Yma Sumac's Mambo!.  The outdoor scenes are largely set in or near Palisades Park in Santa Monica, California.

Track listing
7-inch single
 "Mad About You" (single mix) — 3:30
 "I Never Wanted a Rich Man" — 4:12

12-inch single
"Mad About You" (extended mix) — 5:03
"Mad About You" (single mix) — 3:30
"Mad About You" (instrumental mix) — 3:30

Charts

Weekly charts

Year-end charts

Certifications

See also 
List of RPM number-one singles of 1986
13 Going on 30 soundtrack

References

1986 songs
1986 debut singles
Belinda Carlisle songs
I.R.S. Records singles
RPM Top Singles number-one singles
Song recordings produced by Michael Lloyd